Barrere or Barrère is a French surname. Notable people with the surname include:

 Adrien Barrère (1874–1931), French visual artist
 Camille Barrère (1851–1940), French diplomat
 Georges Barrère (1876–1944), French flutist
 Grégoire Barrère (born 1994), French tennis player
 Granville Barrere (1829–1889), American politician and nephew of Nelson Barrere
 Nelson Barrere (1808–1883), American politician and uncle of Granville Barrere
 Paul Barrere (1948-2019), American rock musician
 Pierre Barrère (1690–1755), French naturalist

See also 
 Barere
 Barrera

French-language surnames